S. Kalyanasundaram is an Indian politician from Dravida Munnetra Kazhagam who is serving as the Member of Rajya Sabha from 30 June 2022. He contested from Coimbatore, Tamil Nadu.

Personal life 
He was born in 24 June 1940 in Kumbakonam, Tamil Nadu.

References 

Rajya Sabha members from Tamil Nadu
1940 births
Living people